Lake Benton is a lake in Lincoln County, Minnesota, in the United States.

Lake Benton was named for Thomas Hart Benton, a United States Senator from Missouri.

A glacial lake, Lake Benton was at one time the largest lake in southwestern Minnesota. Due to the natural processes of evaporation and seepage affecting all glacial lakes, it is smaller now.

See also
List of lakes in Minnesota

References

Lakes of Minnesota
Lakes of Lincoln County, Minnesota